U4/U6.U5 tri-snRNP-associated protein 1 is a protein that in humans is encoded by the SART1 gene.
This gene encodes two proteins, the SART1(800) protein expressed in the nucleus of the majority of proliferating cells, and the SART1(259) protein expressed in the cytosol of epithelial cancers. The SART1(259) protein is translated by the mechanism of -1 frameshifting during posttranscriptional regulation. The two encoded proteins are thought to be involved in the regulation of proliferation. Both proteins have tumor-rejection antigens. The SART1(259) protein possesses tumor epitopes capable of inducing HLA-A2402-restricted cytotoxic T lymphocytes in cancer patients. This SART1(259) antigen may be useful in specific immunotherapy for cancer patients and may serve as a paradigmatic tool for the diagnosis and treatment of patients with atopy. The SART1(259) protein is found to be essential for the recruitment of the tri-snRNP to the pre-spliceosome in the spliceosome assembly pathway.

References

Further reading

Spliceosome